Pius Munyasia (born 6 July 1960) is a Kenyan racewalker. He competed in the men's 20 kilometres walk at the 1984 Summer Olympics.

References

1960 births
Living people
Athletes (track and field) at the 1984 Summer Olympics
Kenyan male racewalkers
Olympic athletes of Kenya
Place of birth missing (living people)
20th-century Kenyan people